Church of San Miguel de Arcángel is a Catholic church in Buenos Aires, Argentina, declared a national historic monument in 1983.

History  

The first chapel was built around 1730 by the initiative of Juan Guillermo González y Aragón, a distinguished Spanish gentleman who after being widowed was dedicated to the priesthood.

Clashes between Spanish and British troops took place during the second British invasion of the River Plate on the street on which the church is located. The current façade is the work of César Augusto Ferrari, who started remodeling works in 1912.

References 

19th-century Roman Catholic church buildings in Argentina
Roman Catholic churches completed in 1830
Christianity in Buenos Aires
Buildings and structures in Buenos Aires